The 2015–16 División de Honor was the 79th season of the División de Honor, Spain's premier field hockey league for women. It began on 24 September 2016 and concluded on 20 May 2017.

Club de Campo were the defending champions.

Teams
A total of 10 teams participated in the 2015–2016 edition of the División de Honor. The promoted teams was CD Terrassa and RC Jolaseta, who replaced Atlètic Terrassa and Universidad de Sevilla.

Results

Regular season

Table

Play–offs

Quarter-finals

|}

Sanse Complutense won the series 2–0.

Club de Campo won the series 2–0.

Júnior won the series 2–0.

Real Sociedad won the series 2–0.

Semi-finals

Final

Top goalscorers

References

External links
Official website

División de Honor Femenina de Hockey Hierba
Spain
field hockey
field hockey